Ministry of Agriculture and Forestry may refer to:

 Ministry of Agriculture and Forestry (Alberta), in the Executive Council of Alberta, Canada
 Ministry of Agriculture and Forestry (Bulgaria), now the Ministry of Agriculture, Food and Forestry
 Ministry of Agriculture and Forestry (Equatorial Guinea)
 Ministry of Agriculture and Forestry (Finland)
 Ministry of Agriculture and Forestry (Japan), now the Ministry of Agriculture, Forestry and Fisheries
 Ministry of Agriculture and Forestry (Kaduna State), Nigeria, now the Ministry of Agriculture
 Ministry of Agriculture and Forestry (Laos)
 Ministry of Agriculture and Forestry (New Zealand), now defunct and part of the Ministry for Primary Industries
 Ministry of Agriculture and Forestry (South Korea), now the Ministry for Food, Agriculture, Forestry and Fisheries
 Ministry of Agriculture and Forestry (South Sudan)
 Ministry of Agriculture and Forestry (Turkey)

See also 
 List of agriculture ministries
 List of forestry ministries